Olha Sumska (born 22 August 1966) is a Ukrainian actress of theater and cinema, television hostess, recipient of the Shevchenko National Prize in 1996 and the People's Artist of Ukraine (2009). In 2006 she attempted to run for a mayor of Kyiv.

Olha was born in city of Lviv in family of actors. She has an older sister Nataliya Sumska who is also an actress. In 1987 Olha graduated the Kyiv Institute of Theatrical Arts and between 1988 and 2006 she was a stage actress of the Lesya Ukrainka National Academic Theater of Russian Drama.

Recognition
 1996 Shevchenko National Prize for television films "Entrapment" and "Crime with many unknown"

References

External links
 Biography
 Biography at kino-svit.com
 Biography at the Shevchenko National Prize Committee
 Olha Sumska information at the Central Election Commission of Ukraine
 Hrytsuk, V. Olha Sumska: I am learning constantly. "Kino-teatr" (Kyiv Mohyla Academy).
 Interview of Dmytro Gordon with Hanna Opanasenko and Vyacheslav Sumsky. Bulvar Gordona. 29 March 2005.
 Olha Sumska at "Rankovyi fresh" (Pravda Tyt)
 Skrypin, R. Olha Sumska: Today I could be multicolored. What do you need? You call the format. Radio Liberty. 16 November 2008.
 Photos of Olha Sumska at the UNIAN

1966 births
Living people
Ukrainian television presenters
Ukrainian film actresses
Ukrainian stage actresses
20th-century Ukrainian actresses
Inter (TV channel) people
1+1 (TV channel) people
Ukrainian Democratic Alliance for Reform politicians
Independent politicians in Ukraine
Recipients of the title of People's Artists of Ukraine
Recipients of the Shevchenko National Prize
Kyiv National I. K. Karpenko-Kary Theatre, Cinema and Television University alumni
Actors from Lviv
Ukrainian women television presenters
Ukrainian LGBT rights activists
Politicians from Lviv